San Ygnacio is a census-designated place (CDP) in Zapata County, Texas, in the United States. As of the 2010 census, the CDP population was 667. It is named for the prominent Spanish saint, Ignatius of Loyola. The portion of the community between the Rio Grande and U.S. Highway 83 is listed on the National Register of Historic Places as San Ygnacio Historic District.

History 
San Ygnacio, originally a Mexican pueblo, was founded in 1830 by settlers from nearby Guerrero, Tamaulipas on the outskirts of the recently established Uribeno Ranch. Frequent Comanche attacks in the early days of San Ygnacio necessitated the use of defensive stone architecture which has endowed the present area with uncharacteristically enduring historical sites from that period.

San Ygnacio is also historically notable for its involvement in the short-lived revolution of the Rio Grande Republic, which was established at meetings which were convened in the town in 1839.

San Ygnacio played an important role in the Garza Revolution from 1891 to 1893. Multiple small battles were fought near the town in both Mexican and American territory.

San Ygnacio was attacked in June 1916 by either Mexican Carrancistas or Seditionists. On June 10, approximately 100 Mexicans fought a losing battle with about 150 American soldiers from the 14th Cavalry.

San Ygnacio was the site of the filming of the 1952 film Viva Zapata.

Although many of San Ygnacio's neighboring municipalities were evacuated and consolidated in the deliberate 1953 flooding of the region which created Falcon Lake and "New" Zapata, San Ygnacio's residents petitioned for the right to remain on their land, which was high enough to escape substantial damage. Having survived, its architectural heritage was acknowledged in 1972 when it was added to the National Register of Historic Places, being the last standing collection of Mexican Ranch vernacular architecture, representing the 19th century settlement of the lower Rio Grande valley.  Its oldest building is now a National Historic Landmark, the Treviño-Uribe Rancho, built 1830.

The private River Pierce Foundation works to continue the restoration of the San Ygnacio Historic District.

Geography
San Ygnacio is located at  (27.043938, -99.439726).

Wildlife
The community is also one of the few locations within the United States to view the Morelet’s seedeater, a small sparrow-like bird that inhabits second growth stands of Phragmites along the Rio Grande.

Demographics
As of the census of 2000, there were 853 people, 253 households, and 198 families residing in the CDP. The population density was 556.7 people per square mile (215.3/km2). There were 355 housing units at an average density of 231.7/sq mi (89.6/km2). The racial makeup of the CDP was 79.13% White, 1.17% African American, 0.35% Native American, 17.35% from other races, and 1.99% from two or more races. Hispanic or Latino of any race were 92.97% of the population.

There were 253 households, out of which 44.7% had children under the age of 18 living with them, 58.9% were married couples living together, 15.8% had a female householder with no husband present, and 21.7% were non-families. 20.6% of all households were made up of individuals, and 11.9% had someone living alone who was 65 years of age or older. The average household size was 3.37 and the average family size was 3.97.

In the CDP, the population was spread out, with 33.6% under the age of 18, 11.4% from 18 to 24, 23.9% from 25 to 44, 19.7% from 45 to 64, and 11.4% who were 65 years of age or older. The median age was 30 years. For every 100 females, there were 107.5 males. For every 100 females age 18 and over, there were 101.4 males.

The median income for a household in the CDP was $16,563, and the median income for a family was $19,375. Males had a median income of $17,344 versus $12,188 for females. The per capita income for the CDP was $6,968. About 48.2% of families and 54.5% of the population were below the poverty line, including 61.1% of those under age 18 and 25.4% of those age 65 or over.

Education
All of Zapata County is a part of the Zapata County Independent School District.

Politics
In the 2020 United States presidential election in Texas the community more heavily voted for Donald Trump than political operatives expected as residents felt obliged to protect their oil and gas related jobs, and pro-Trump organizers contacted residents in-person while pro-Biden ones, due to COVID-19-related cautions, did not.

Trivia
San Ygnacio was the site of the filming of the 1952 film Viva Zapata.

See also

National Register of Historic Places listings in Zapata County, Texas

Bibliography

Lott, Virgil N., and Martinez, Sr., Mercurio J. (1953) (father of Webb County County Judge Mercurio Martinez, Jr.). The Kingdom of Zapata. Austin, Texas, Eakin Press.

References

External links

San Ygnacio, Texas from Texas Escapes

Census-designated places in Zapata County, Texas
Census-designated places in Texas